The Century Building located in the Pittsburgh, Pennsylvania Cultural District, was built as an office building in 1907 by the Century Land Company. This twelve-story building currently houses a restaurant, two floors of offices and 60 units of mixed-income housing. It was listed on the National Register of Historic Places in 2008.

Awards
The Century Building was awarded an AIA Pittsburgh Award of Excellence in the category of Historic Preservation in 2010.

References

Commercial buildings on the National Register of Historic Places in Pennsylvania
Beaux-Arts architecture in Pennsylvania
Buildings designated early commercial in the National Register of Historic Places
Commercial buildings completed in 1907
Commercial buildings in Pittsburgh
National Register of Historic Places in Pittsburgh